Loving You, Loving U, Lovin' You, or Luvin' You may refer to:

Film 
 Loving You (1957 film), a film starring Elvis Presley
 Loving You (1995 film), a Chinese film starring Sean Lau
 Loving You (2003 film), a British television crime drama
 Loving You (2008 film), a Filipino film

Literature 
 Loving You (manga), a manga illustrated by Nami Akimoto
 Loving You, a 2003 novel by Maureen Child

Music

Albums
 Loving U, by Sistar, or the title song, 2012
 Loving You (Shirley Horn album) or the title song, 1997
 Loving You (soundtrack), by Elvis Presley, or the title song (see below), 1957
 Loving You, by Lani Misalucha, 2003
 Loving You, by Nick Kamen, 1988
 Loving You, by Tommy Page, 1996
 Luvin' You, by One Voice, or the title song, 2004

Songs
 "Lovin' You", by Minnie Riperton, 1975; covered by Shanice, 1992
 "Lovin' You" (Kristine W song), 2001
 "Lovin' You" (The O'Jays song), 1987
 "Lovin' You" (S.E.S. song), 2000
 "Lovin' You" (Soulhead song), recording as Batti Baas, 2001
 "Lovin' You" (TVXQ song), 2007
 "Lovin' You", by the Lovin' Spoonful from Hums of the Lovin' Spoonful, 1966
 "Lovin' You", by Pat Travers from Putting It Straight, 1977
 "Lovin' You", by Tony! Toni! Tone! from House of Music, 1996
 "Loving You" (Chris Rea song), 1982
 "Loving You" (Elvis Presley song), 1957
 "Loving You" (Feargal Sharkey song), 1985
 "Loving You" (Matt Cardle and Melanie C song), 2013
 "Loving You" (Michael Jackson song), 2014
 "Loving You" (Nina Girado song), 2003
 "Loving You (Is a Way of Life)", by Jon Stevens, 1980
 "Loving You (Ole Ole Ole)", by Brian Harvey, 2001
 "Loving You", by Atomic Kitten from Ladies Night, 2003
 "Loving You", by Badfinger from No Dice, 1992 reissue
 "Loving You", by Duffy, a B-side of "Warwick Avenue", 2008
 "Loving You", by Jennifer Lopez from This Is Me... Then, 2002
 "Loving You", by Jessica Simpson from In This Skin, 2003
 "Loving You", by Marc et Claude, 2001
 "Loving You", by the Orb from the single "A Huge Ever Growing Pulsating Brain That Rules from the Centre of the Ultraworld", 1989
 "Loving You", written by Stephen Sondheim for the musical Passion, 1994

See also